Attila Klaus-Peter Hildmann (born 22 April 1981) is a German vegan cookbook author and far-right conspiracy theorist. He has described himself as "ultra-right-wing" and as a German nationalist. He was repeatedly characterized as antisemitic. He has been wanted with a European arrest warrant by German prosecutors since 2021 and is on the run.

Biography 

Born in West Berlin, Hildmann is of Turkish descent and was raised by German adoptive parents. He studied for a diploma in physics at the Free University of Berlin but failed to graduate.

Hildmann became vegetarian after witnessing his adoptive father die of a heart attack whilst on a ski trip in 2000. He attributed the death to excessive meat consumption resulting in hypercholesterolemia (high cholesterol). Fearing the same fate and being heavily overweight, he renounced meat and fish products, and began to exercise regularly, losing 35 kg in weight. Over time, he abstained from consuming almost all animal products and became primarily vegan.

In 2009, Hildmann wrote his first vegan cookbook. In 2012, his Vegan for Fun was named cookbook of the year by Vegetarierbund Deutschland, the German branch of the International Vegetarian Union.

Hildmann appears in YouTube videos and has been featured in numerous television programs and talk shows, including Maischberger, TV total, ZDF's Volle Kanne, SWR's Nachtcafé, and Westdeutscher Rundfunk's daheim + unterwegs. In March 2016, he was a contestant in the TV show Let's Dance.

In April 2017, Hildmann participated in the TV show Schlag den Star against Luke Mockridge.

Controversies and conspiracy theories 
In 2015, Hildmann commented on the European migrant crisis, stating: "Integration in Germany is a sensitive issue because of the German past, resulting in a current self-mutilation of German values and culture." This remark was criticized by Bayerischer Rundfunk as a "symbiosis of right-wing extremism with boundless love for animals."

Hildmann spread conspiracy theories about the COVID-19 pandemic in 2020. In June 2020, Hildmann shared antisemitic conspiracy theories, calling himself a German nationalist and saying that Jews wanted 'to exterminate the German race'. His public sharing of these views have resulted in German police pursuing criminal charges against him and loss of revenue; brands he served as spokesman for have severed ties with him. He has denied the Holocaust.

Hildmann claimed in August 2020 during the closure of the Pergamon Altar in Berlin, caused by COVID-19, that satanic rituals were performed at night and that the altar was a "centre of global satanists and Corona criminals". BBC noted that several German media sources connected these claims to cases of vandalism against the museum that occurred later, on 3 October, the national holiday.

He has also accused the German government of working in the service of Bill Gates to promote forced COVID-19 vaccinations and a surveillance state. After being banned from mainstream social media, Hildmann built a network of cross-posting accounts on Telegram, and uploads antisemitic videos on "wtube", a hate speech platform hidden by Cloudflare and evading German judicial authorities.

On 29 August 2020, Hildmann was arrested at a COVID-19 conspiracy protest outside the Russian embassy in Berlin after protestors assaulted seven police officers and threw rocks and glass at the embassy and police.

In November 2020 Berlin police searched his home and confiscated six computers as well as several cellphones, after taking over investigations from Brandenburg authorities.
An arrest warrant for slander, harassment and incitement to racial hatred was finally issued in February 2021, but Hildmann had been absent from his home for several weeks at this time. A betrayal of state secrets by an unidentified sympathizer in the judiciary was suspected because of this.
Hildmann moved to Turkey in early 2021, evading prosecution in Germany.

His Telegram channel was blocked in June 2021 by unknown means, leaving Hildemann unable to communicate with his  followers on that platform.
In July 2021 WDR and Süddeutsche Zeitung reported that Berlin authorities were investigating a total of 80 alleged criminal acts of Hildmann. An extradition was considered unlikely due to his dual (German and Turkish) citizenship.

Books 
 
 
  Norderstedt: Books on Demand, .
  Becker Joest Volk Verlag, .
 
 
 
 Attila Hildmann (2015) (in German), Vegan for Starters. Die einfachsten und beliebtesten Rezepte aus vier Kochbüchern, Hilden, Beck Joest Volk Verlag, 
 Attila Hildmann (2015) (in German), Vegan Italian Style. Moderne italienische Küche, Hilden, Becker Joest Volk Verlag, .
 Attila Hildmann (2016) (in German), Vegan Smoothies, Shakes, and Ice Cream - Green Smoothies und Superfoods in ihrer leckersten Form aus der Bestsellerküche von Attila Hildmann, Hilden, Becker Joest Volk Verlag, .
 Attila Hildmann (2016) (in German), Vegan for Fit Gipfelstürmer - Die 7-Tage-Detox-Diät, Hilden, Becker Joest Volk Verlag, .

References

External links 
 Works by Attila Hildmann at the German National Library
 
 Attila Hildmann on YouTube

1981 births
Living people
Chefs of vegan cuisine
COVID-19 conspiracy theorists
German adoptees
German chefs
German conspiracy theorists
German food writers
German Holocaust deniers
German people of Turkish descent
German television chefs
German veganism activists
Vegan cookbook writers
Veganism in Germany
Writers from Berlin